is a species of carpenter ant, endemic to the Daitō Islands, Japan. The species make nests in trees.

References

External links
 Camponotus daitoensis at AntWeb

Insects described in 1999
daitoensis
Ants of Japan
Endemic fauna of Japan